Astral City: A Spiritual Journey is a 2010 Brazilian drama film directed by Wagner de Assis, starring Renato Prieto. It is based on the book of the same name by the medium Francisco Cândido Xavier, and features a soundtrack composed by Philip Glass.

Distributed by 20th Century Fox, the film also features well-known actors and actresses from Brazilian telenovelas such as Othon Bastos, Ana Rosa and Paulo Goulart, among others. It was shot on location in Rio de Janeiro and Brasília, during the months of July, August and September 2009, with its post-production taking 9 months to be completed. It was released on September 3, 2010 in Brazil to great critical acclaim and more than one million viewers in its opening weekend. In 2015, the Brazilian Spiritualist Federation (FEB) first announced the sequel to Astral City: A Spiritual Journey, entitled Nosso Lar 2: Os Mensageiros, scheduled to be released in 2023.

Plot
When André Luiz, a selfish prominent physician and father of three, dies, instead of rising to what he believed would be heaven, he awakens in a valley of devastation. Living as a castaway, he, as well as the other spirits around him, is deemed to have been a suicide, and it is beyond him why he has had such a fate.

One day, a beam of light comes down from the sky bringing rescue to spirits in deep troughs of the Valley. André is rescued and lifted to a spiritual city named Nosso Lar (Our Home). There, he makes new friends and alliances but also meets his enemy – himself. He has betrayed his own existence by his self-destructive actions during his life on Earth, and, in order to prove he still truly values life, he must gain merits in the eyes of the city's Ministries through humbling hard work.

Finally, his greatest wish since arriving in the city comes true: he is granted permission to descend to Earth and see his wife and kids. Ten years have passed, his wife has remarried and his children have grown up. In this awakening moment, André has to put into play what he has learned back in Nosso Lar. He must accept his own death and step into another level of existence, learning to love and be loved, and that life never ceases.

Cast
 Renato Prieto as André Luiz
 Gabriel Azevedo as 20-year-old André Luiz
 Gabriel Scheer as 10-year-old André Luiz
 Fernando Alves Pinto as Lísias
 Rosanne Mulholland as Eloísa
 Inez Vianna as Narcisa
 Rodrigo dos Santos as Tobias
 Werner Schünemann as Emmanuel
 Clemente Viscaíno as Minister Clarêncio
 Ana Rosa as Laura, Lísias' mother
 Othon Bastos as Anacleto, Governor of Nosso Lar
 Paulo Goulart as Minister Genésio
 Helena Varvaki as Zélia
 Aracy Cardoso as Dona Amélia, André Luiz's patient
 Selma Egrei as Luísa, André Luiz's mother
 Nicola Siri as Ernesto, Zélia's current husband
 Lisa Fávero as Clarice, André Luiz's daughter
 Jeniffer Oliveira as 10-year-old Clarice
 Amélia Bittencourt as Judite, Lísias' aunt
 César Cardadeiro as Mariano, André Luiz's son
 Pedro Lucas Lopes as 10-year-old Mariano
 Chica Xavier as Ismália, André Luiz's maid
 Cristina Xavier as 35-year-old Ismália

Production

Background
The film is an adaptation of the 1944 book of the same name, said to be dictated by the spirit Andre Luiz and psychographed by Chico Xavier, Brazil's best-known and respected medium, having channeled more than 400 books. The book is considered a great classic of spiritist literature. Engaging the reader from a first-person narrative, Andre Luiz delivers his impressions of the spirit world he encounters after his death.

Detailed drawings of the city "Our Home" as well as the architecture of the buildings, ministries and homes, were created by the medium Heigorina Cunha through her observations made during her alleged travels outside of the body in March 1979, led and guided by the spirit Lucius. These drawings served as inspiration to create the visual architecture of the city, that are seen in the movie. His drawings have been clarified and confirmed by Chico Xavier that this was really the spiritual city of Rio de Janeiro called "Our Home".

Visual effects
Nosso Lar is rich in special effects. The majority of the movie takes place in this spiritual city, which is famous in the Spiritist movement. Many spiritists and spiritualists waited anxiously for the release of the film that recorded the second highest debut of a Brazilian film since the rebirth of Brazilian cinema in the 1990s, after Elite Squad: The Enemy Within, released one month later.

For photography and special effects, international professionals were invited, including director of photography Ueli Steiger (from 10,000 BC and The Day After Tomorrow) and special effects supervisor Lev Kolobov, the Canadian firm Intelligent Creatures (The Hunting Party, Babel, and Watchmen).

References

External links
 
 
 Helpful article about Chico Xavier, an earlier film in this series and the upcoming related films about Chico Xavier

2010 films
Films scored by Philip Glass
Brazilian drama films
2010s Portuguese-language films
Films shot in Brasília
Films shot in Rio de Janeiro (city)
Films about reincarnation
Films about Spiritism
2010 drama films